is a Japanese actor who debuted in 2002. His first movie was Moonlight Jellyfish, in which he co-starred with Tatsuya Fujiwara. He played the role of Michio, a mentally challenged 15-year-old boy diagnosed with an incurable skin disease called XP (Xeroderma Pigmentosum).

Filmography

Television

Movies

References

External links
Official Site
Japanese Wikipedia

Japanese male film actors
Japanese male television actors
Japanese male child actors
People from Mitaka, Tokyo
Male actors from Tokyo
1988 births
Living people
21st-century Japanese male actors